The Shvetsov M-11 is a five-cylinder air-cooled radial aircraft engine produced in the Soviet Union between 1923 and 1952.

Design and development
The Shvetsov M-11 was designed under a 1923 competition in the Soviet Union for a new engine to power trainer aircraft. It is a single-row five-cylinder air-cooled radial piston engine with aluminum cylinder heads. Like the American Kinner B-5 5-cylinder radial of similar size, the M-11 had individual camshafts for each cylinder, operating the pushrods, rather than a single central cam ring. The initial versions of the M-11 suffered from a short service life of only 50 hours. The basic M-11 engine had a power output of 100 hp (73 kW), the newer M-11D variant was higher at 125 hp (92 kW). The ultimate version, M-11FR, introduced in 1946, increased power output to 160 hp at 1,900 rpm on takeoff and 140 hp at cruise and had provisions for a variable-pitch propeller, accessory drive (for vacuum pumps, compressors, generators, etc.) and featured a floatless carburetor.

Variants
Data from:
M-100 Designation of prototype and initial designs.
M-11a / 
M-11/A / 
M-11B / 
M-11D / 
M-11ECompression ratio 6:1 -  / 
M-11F / 
M-11FM
M-11FRCompression ratio 5.5:1 -  / 
M-11FR-1Compression ratio 5.5:1 -  / 
M-11FN
M-11G / 
M-11ICompression ratio 5.5:1 -  / 
M-11K / 
M-11L / 
M-11M
M-11V / 
M-11Ya:A projected development of the M-11 at GAZ-41. The prototype was run but results were unsatisfactory, re-designated M-12
M-11YeDeveloped by Okromechko

Further developments

3M-11 An alternative designation for the M-50 three cylinder derivative of the M-11
M-12 A  development of the M-11 by M.A. Kossov, un-related to the NAMI-100, which had been earlier designated M-12.
M-12 (M-11Ya)A projected development of the M-11 at GAZ-41. The prototype was run but results were unsatisfactory, re-designated from M-11Ya
M-13 (M-13K) A 1944 development by M.A. Kossov to be assembled from various M-11 variants
M-13 In parallel with the M-13K, E.V. Urmin at GAZ-41 mated cylinders from the M-11D with new crankshaft and crankcase
M-13 A later M-13 was created by I.A. Muzhilov at OKB-41 in 1946. Despite passing state acceptance test in June 1948, this engine was not put into production.
M-48A 7-cylinder further development at GAZ-29 
M-49A 9-cylinder further development at GAZ-29  / 
M-50A 3-cylinder further development at GAZ-29 
M-51A 5-cylinder further development at GAZ-29  / 
MG-11Development of the M-51 at the NIIGVF (Nauchno-Issledovatel'skiy Institut Grazdahnskovo Vozdooshnovo Flota - civil air fleet scientific test institute) by M.A. Kossov.  / 
MG-21Development of the M-48 at the NIIGVF by M.A. Kossov.  / 
MG-31Development of the M-49 at the NIIGVF by M.A. Kossov.  / 
MG-50 A projected 18 cylinder, two-row radial derived from M-11 components by M.A. Kossov.   /

Applications
The M-11 powered a number of Soviet, Bulgarian and Polish aircraft. The M-11 remained in production until 1952 with an estimated total of over 100,000 engines made. Several hundreds of M-11D and M-11FR-1 variants were manufactured under license in the Polish WSK-Kalisz works in Kalisz. It was also used for the up-engined GAZ-98K aerosani winter-used sled in a pusher configuration, and as the standard powerplant for the similar NKL-26 propeller-driven sledges during the World War II years.

Anbo II (replica)
Gribovsky G-15
Gribovsky G-20
Gribovsky G-21
Gribovsky G-23
Gribovsky G-27
Kharkiv KhAI-3
Laz-7M
LWD Junak
Mikoyan-Gurevich MiG-8 Utka
Polikarpov Po-2
PZL S-4 Kania
Shavrov_Sh-2 amphibian
Shcherbakov Shche-2
Yakovlev UT-1
Yakovlev UT-2
Yakovlev Yak-6
Yakovlev Yak-12
Yakovlev Yak-18

Specifications (M-11A)

See also

References

Notes

Bibliography

 Gunston, Bill. World Encyclopedia of Aero Engines. Cambridge, England. Patrick Stephens Limited, 1989. 
 Kotelnikov, Vladimir. Russian Piston Aero Engines. Marlborough, Wiltshire. The Crowood Press Ltd. 2005. .

1920s aircraft piston engines
Aircraft air-cooled radial piston engines
Shvetsov aircraft engines